Artificial Minds: An Exploration of the Mechanisms of Mind is a book written by Stan Franklin and published in 1995 by MIT Press.

The book is a wide-ranging tour of the development of artificial intelligence as of the time it was written. As well as discussing the theoretical and philosophical backgrounds of many approaches, it goes into some detail in explaining the workings of many of what the author considers to be the most promising examples of the era.

References
 Causey, Robert L. (1998) Review of Artificial Minds by Stan Franklin. ACM SIGART Bulletin 9(1): 35–39.
 da Fontoura Costa, Luciano. (1999) "Franklin's New Infant Theory of Mind: Review of Artificial Minds: An Exploration of the Mechanisms of Mind by Stan Franklin." Psyche 5(29): n. pag.
 Wolpert, Seth. (1997) Review of Artificial Minds by Stan Franklin. Computers in Physics 11(3): 258–259.

1995 non-fiction books
Artificial intelligence publications
Computer science books